Cuba–Trinidad and Tobago relations are bilateral relations with current relationship between Republic of Cuba and the Republic of Trinidad and Tobago. Both nations formally established diplomatic relations on the 8 December 1972.

History
On the seventh to the eighth of December 2011, Trinidad and Tobago hosted the 7th CARICOM-Cuba Summit in the city of Port of Spain at the Northern National Academy for the Performing Arts (NAPA). The Cuban President, Raúl Castro arrived in Piarco International Airport, Trinidad on the 6 December 2011, at about 10:53 am and he was greeted by Trinidad and Tobago's President George Maxwell Richards, Prime Minister Kamla Persad-Bissessar and some of her government members.

Bilateral agreements

Diplomacy

Of Cuba
Port of Spain (Embassy)

Of Trinidad and Tobago
 Havana (Embassy)

References

Trinidad
Bilateral relations of Trinidad and Tobago